Nupserha acuta is a species of beetle in the family Cerambycidae. It was described by Holzschuh in 1986.

References

acuta
Beetles described in 1986